The 1961 All-SEC football team consists of American football players selected to the All-Southeastern Conference (SEC) chosen by various selectors for the 1961 NCAA University Division football season.

All-SEC selections

Ends
Tom Hutchinson, Kentucky (AP-1, UPI-1)
Dave Edwards, Auburn (AP-1, UPI-1)
Ralph Smith, Ole Miss (AP-2, UPI-2)
Johnny Baker, Miss. St. (AP-2, UPI-2)
Tommy Brooker, Alabama (AP-3, UPI-3)
Gene Sykes, LSU (AP-3)
Dave Gash, Kentucky (UPI-3)

Tackles
Billy Neighbors, Alabama (AP-1, UPI-1)
Jim Dunaway, Ole Miss (AP-1, UPI-1)
Pete Case, Georgia (AP-2, UPI-1)
Billy Booth, LSU (AP-2, UPI-3)
Jim Beaver, Florida (AP-3, UPI-2)
Ernie Colquette, Tulane (AP-3)
Billy Wilson, Auburn (UPI-3)

Guards
Roy Winston, LSU (AP-1, UPI-1)
Dave Watson, Georgia Tech (AP-1, UPI-1)
Harold Erickson, Georgia Tech (AP-2)
Monk Guillot, LSU (AP-2)
Rufus Guthrie, Georgia Tech (UPI-2)
Bookie Bolin, Ole Miss (UPI-2)
Billy Ray Jones, Ole Miss (AP-3, UPI-3)
Howard Benton, Miss. St. (AP-3)
Gus Gonzales, Tulane (UPI-3)

Centers
Mike Lucci, Tennessee (AP-1, UPI-2)
Lee Roy Jordan, Alabama (AP-2, UPI-1)
Wayne Frazier, Auburn (AP-3)
Irv Goode, Kentucky (UPI-3)

Quarterbacks
Pat Trammell, Alabama (AP-1, UPI-1)
Doug Elmore, Ole Miss (AP-2, UPI-2)
Hank Lesesne, Vanderbilt (AP-3)

Halfbacks
Billy Ray Adams, Ole Miss (AP-1, UPI-1)
Mike Fracchia, Alabama (AP-1, UPI-1)
Jerry Stovall, LSU (College Football Hall of Fame) (AP-2, UPI-1)
Mallon Faircloth, Tennessee (AP-2, UPI-3)
Billy Williamson, Georgia Tech (AP-3, UPI-2)
Don Goodman, Florida (AP-3, UPI-3)
Jerry Woolum, Kentucky (UPI-3)
Bobby Hunt, Auburn (UPI-3)

Fullbacks
Wendell Harris, LSU (AP-1, UPI-2)
Bill McKenny, Georgia (AP-2, UPI-2)
Earl Gros, LSU (AP-3)

Key

AP = Associated Press

UPI = United Press International

Bold = Consensus first-team selection by both AP and UPI

See also
1961 College Football All-America Team

References

All-SEC
All-SEC football teams